John I Tzimiskes (925 – 10 January 976) was the senior Byzantine emperor from 969 to 976. An intuitive and successful general who married into the influential Skleros family, he strengthened and expanded the Byzantine Empire to include Thrace and Syria by warring with the Rus under Sviatoslav I and the Fatimids respectively.

Background 

John was born in present-day Çemişgezek in Tunceli Province. His father was a scion of the Kourkouas family, a clan of debated Armenian origin that had established itself as one of the chief families among the Anatolian military aristocracy by the early 10th century. His mother belonging to the Phokas family of unknown ethnicity, maybe Greek-Armenian origin. Scholars have speculated that "Tzimiskes" was derived either from the Armenian Chmushkik (Չմշկիկ), meaning "red boot", or from an Armenian word for "short stature", as explained by Leo the Deacon. A more favorable explanation is offered by the medieval Armenian historian Matthew of Edessa, who states that Tzimiskes was from the region of Khozan, from the area called Chmushkatzag. Khozan was located in the region of Paghnatun, in the Byzantine province of Fourth Armenia (Sophene). Either way, "Tzimiskes" was a surname used by other members of John's family, as the Armenian historian Stepanos Asoghik refers to him as the "grandson of Č‘mškik".

Tzimiskes was born in 924 or 925, as Leo the Deacon states that he died aged 51, to an unnamed member of the Kourkouas family and the sister of the future Emperor Nikephoros II Phokas. Both the Kourkouai and the Phokadai were distinguished Cappadocian families, and among the most prominent of the emerging military aristocracy of Asia Minor. Several of their members had served as prominent army generals, most notably the great John Kourkouas, who conquered Melitene and much of Armenia.

Contemporary sources describe Tzimiskes as a rather short but well-built man, with reddish blonde hair and beard and blue eyes who was attractive to women. He seems to have joined the army at an early age, originally under the command of his maternal uncle Nikephoros Phokas. The latter is also considered his instructor in the art of war. Partly because of his familial connections and partly because of his personal abilities, Tzimiskes quickly rose through the ranks. He was given the political and military command of the theme of Armenia before he turned twenty-five years old.

His marriage to Maria Skleraina, daughter of Pantherios Skleros and sister of Bardas Skleros, linked him to the influential Skleros family. Little is known about her; she died before his rise to the throne, and the marriage was apparently childless. The contemporary historian Leo the Deacon remarks that she excelled in both beauty and wisdom.

Rise to the throne 

The Byzantine Empire was at war with its eastern neighbors, the various autonomous and semi-autonomous emirates emerging from the break-up of the Abbasid Caliphate. The most prominent among them was the Hamdanid Emirate of Aleppo, under Sayf al-Dawla. Armenia served as the borderland between the two Empires, and Tzimiskes successfully defended his province. He and his troops joined the main army which was campaigning under the command of Nikephoros Phokas.

By 962 the Hamdanids had sued for peace with favorable terms for the Byzantines, securing the eastern border of the Empire for some years. Tzimiskes distinguished himself during the war both at the side of his uncle and at leading parts of the army to battle under his personal command, as in the Battle of Raban in 958. He was rather popular with his troops and gained a reputation for taking the initiative during battles, turning their course.

On the death of Emperor Romanos II in 963, Tzimiskes urged his uncle to seize the throne. After helping Nikephoros to the throne and continuing to defend the Empire's eastern provinces, Tzimiskes was deprived of his command by an intrigue, for which he retaliated by conspiring with Nikephoros' wife Theophano and a number of disgruntled leading generals (Michael Bourtzes and Leo Balantes) to assassinate Nikephoros.

Reign 
After his coronation in December 969, Tzimiskes dispatched his brother-in-law Bardas Skleros to subdue a rebellion by Bardas Phokas, a cousin of Tzimiskes who aspired to succeed their uncle as emperor. To solidify his position, Tzimiskes married Theodora, a daughter of Emperor Constantine VII. He proceeded to justify his usurpation by repelling the foreign invaders of the Empire. The tributary of Aleppo was soon assured under the Treaty of Safar.

During his early reign he had to fight of Kievan Rus' encroachment on the Lower Danube. In 970 he sent his brother-in-law, Bardas Skleros, to push the Rus out of Thrace; Skleros defeated the Rus at Arcadiopolis. In 971, John Tzimiskes took the main army across Mt. Haemus, and besieged the fortress of Dorostolon (Silistra) on the Danube for 65 days, where after several hard-fought battles he defeated Grand Prince Sviatoslav I of Rus'. Tzimiskes and Sviatoslav ended up negotiating a truce, in which weaponry, armor and provisions were exchanged for the famished Rus' departure.
On his return to Constantinople, Tzimiskes celebrated a triumph, expanded the Church of Christ of the Chalke as thanksgiving, divested the captive Bulgarian Emperor Boris II of the Imperial symbols, and proclaimed Bulgaria annexed. He further secured his northern frontier by transplanting to Thrace some colonies of the Paulicians, whom he suspected of sympathising with their Muslim neighbours in the east.
In 972, Tzimiskes turned against the Abbasid Empire and its vassals, beginning with an invasion of Upper Mesopotamia. A second campaign, in 975, was aimed at Syria, where his forces took Emesa, Heliopolis, Damascus, Tiberias, Nazareth, Caesarea, Sidon, Beirut, Byblos, and Tripoli, but failed to take Jerusalem.

Death 
Tzimiskes died suddenly in 976 returning from his second campaign against the Abbasids and was buried in the Church of Christ Chalkites, which he had rebuilt. Several sources state that the Imperial chamberlain Basil Lekapenos poisoned the Emperor to prevent him from stripping Lekapenos of his ill-gotten lands and riches. Tzimiskes left all his own personal wealth to the poor and the sick. He was succeeded by his ward and nephew, Basil II, who had been nominal co-emperor since 960. He left his successor a strengthened and expanded Empire.

Legacy 
Tsimiski Street, the main commercial road in the center of Thessaloniki, is named after him. Çemişgezek in the Tunceli Province, modern day Turkey, is named after him, as he was born there.

See also

List of Byzantine emperors

Notes

Sources

External links 

Profile of Emperor John
Coinage of Tzimiskes

10th-century Byzantine emperors
Macedonian dynasty
Armenian Byzantine emperors
Byzantine people of the Arab–Byzantine wars
Byzantine people of the Byzantine–Bulgarian Wars
920s births
976 deaths
Date of birth unknown
Kourkouas family
Domestics of the Schools
960s in the Byzantine Empire
970s in the Byzantine Empire
Burials in Constantinople
Governors of the Anatolic Theme